Lamoille Canyon Road, also known as Lamoille Canyon Scenic Byway, is a  National Forest Scenic Byway in Elko County, Nevada in the western United States. The road traverses Lamoille Canyon in the Ruby Mountains of northeastern Nevada, and it is administered by the Ruby Mountains Ranger District of the Humboldt-Toiyabe National Forest.

Route description

Lamoille Canyon Road is officially designated National Forest Road 660 (NF 660). Its southern terminus is at a large parking area in Lamoille Canyon with multiple trailheads. Once outside of the canyon, the road continues north toward the small town of Lamoille, reaching its northern terminus west of town at an intersection with SR 227. The eastern terminus of SR 227 is located about one mile east of this location.

The road is not plowed in the winter, when it is used for winter recreation such as cross-country skiing and snowmobiling. Motor vehicle access to the upper end of the road is generally limited to the months of June through October, though this is partly dependent on snowfall. In contrast, the section of the road below  is usually motor-vehicle accessible for most of the year.

Points of interest
Powerhouse Picnic Area, Camp Lamoille, Thomas Canyon Campground, Changing Canyon Nature Trail, Terraces Picnic Area, and Roads End Trailhead are all located along Lamoille Canyon Road. The Roads End Trailhead is the northern terminus of the Ruby Crest National Recreation Trail.

History
Lamoille Canyon Road was constructed by the Civilian Conservation Corps in the 1930s and 1940s.

Major intersections

References

External links

National Forest Scenic Byways
Ruby Mountains
Transportation in Elko County, Nevada